Peter Deimböck (born 24 April 1942) is a former Austrian cyclist. He competed in the team time trial and team pursuit events at the 1960 Summer Olympics. He was born in Vienna, his profession is a baker.

References

External links
 

1942 births
Living people
Austrian male cyclists
Olympic cyclists of Austria
Cyclists at the 1960 Summer Olympics
Cyclists from Vienna